The 2017–18 American Eagles men's basketball team represented American University during the 2017–18 NCAA Division I men's basketball season. The Eagles, led by fifth-year head coach Mike Brennan, played their home games at Bender Arena in Washington, D.C. as members of the Patriot League. They finished the season 6–24, 3–15 in Patriot League play to finish in last place. They lost in the first round of the Patriot League tournament to Lafayette.

Previous season 
The Eagles finished the 2016–17 season 8–22, 5–13 in Patriot League play to finish in a tie for ninth place. As the No. 9 seed in the Patriot League tournament, they lost in the first round to Army.

Roster

Schedule and results

|-
!colspan=9 style=| Exhibition Tour of Australia

|-
!colspan=9 style=| Non-conference regular season

|-
!colspan=9 style=| Patriot League regular season

|-
!colspan=9 style=| Patriot League tournament

See also
2017–18 American Eagles women's basketball team

References

American Eagles men's basketball seasons
American
American Eagles men's basketball
American Eagles men's basketball